The Khmers Kampuchea-Krom Federation (KKF) is an organization self-declared representing the indigenous Khmer Krom peoples living in the Mekong Delta of Vietnam, internationally advocating for human rights, religious freedom and self determination.

Founding

The organization was established in 1985, when the First World Convention on Khmer Krom was held in New York City, USA. In 1996, the Fifth World Convention in Toronto, Canada the current name of Khmers Kampuchea-Krom Federation (KKF) was adopted.

Mission

The KKF's mission is to use of peaceful measures and international laws, to seek freedom, justice, and the right to self-determination for the Indigenous Khmer-Krom Peoples living in Vietnam.

Leadership structure

KKF Board of Directors consists of: Chairman, President, Vice-President, Chief of Administration, Senior Council, Representatives Council, Secretary, Treasure, Director of Planning, Director of Information, Director of Women, Director of Youth, Director of Education, and Director of Religious Affairs.

The Board of Directors are democratically elected every four years by the members from around the world including Australia, Cambodia, Canada, France, Italy, New Zealand, and the United States.

The President, who leads the executive committee, is responsible for daily operations of the federation.

KKF is also led by the Presidents of Regional, Continental, and local chapters.

KKF has been a member of Unrepresented Nations and Peoples Organization (UNPO), International Dragon Boat Federation (IDBF) since 2001, and United Nations Department of Public Information (UN DPI) since 2015. KKF has also participated actively in the annual session of the United Nations Permanent Forum on Indigenous Issues (UNPFII) since 2004.

Economy

The KKF has a budget consisting of donations from Khmer-Krom exiles living in the United States, Canada, Australia, New Zealand, Europe and sympathizers.

Flag

The Khmer Krom’s flag was designed by KKF's first Chairman, Mr. Tan Dara Thach in 1985, has three colors: Blue, Yellow, and Red.
The flag’s size is "3 by 5". The meaning of each color is as follows:

 Blue: represents Freedom and Democracy
 Yellow: represents Khmer-Krom who love Peace and Justice
 Red: represents Khmer-Krom’s Bravery and Sacrifice for the fatherland

Logo

The KKF’s logo is called, Rear Hoo Chap Chan.

Reahu is a fictitious character in the Reamker, the Khmer version of the Ramayana, which is one of the most popular mythical stories in Khmer literature.

Reahu Chap Chan is the painting depicted a monster-like figure catching the moon (chan in Khmer means ''moon''). According to Khmer folklore, this causes a lunar eclipse.

See also

 Government of Free Vietnam
 Montagnard Foundation, Inc.
 People's Action Party of Vietnam
 Vietnamese Constitutional Monarchist League
 Viet Tan
 Nationalist Party of Greater Vietnam

Notes

External links
 Khmers Kampuchea-Krom Federation

Vietnamese democracy movements
Vietnamese human rights activists
Politics of Vietnam
Anti-communism in Vietnam
1985 establishments in New York (state)
Vietnamese community organizations
Overseas Vietnamese organizations
Members of the Unrepresented Nations and Peoples Organization